Ted Collings (5 June 1943 – 18 June 2011) was an  Australian rules footballer who played with South Melbourne in the Victorian Football League (VFL).

Notes

External links 

1943 births
2011 deaths
Australian rules footballers from Victoria (Australia)
Sydney Swans players